Ārons Bogoļubovs (Aron Gershevich Bogolyubov, ; born 30 December 1938) was a Latvian judoka who competed for the Soviet Union in the 1964 Summer Olympics. He is Jewish. At the 1964 Summer Olympics in Tokyo, he won a bronze medal in judo in the lightweight class.

See also
List of select Jewish judokas

References

External links
 

1938 births
Living people
Latvian male judoka
Russian male judoka
Soviet male judoka
Olympic judoka of the Soviet Union
Judoka at the 1964 Summer Olympics
Olympic bronze medalists for the Soviet Union
Latvian Jews
Soviet Jews
Jewish sportspeople
Olympic medalists in judo
Medalists at the 1964 Summer Olympics
Jewish martial artists